Tigerair flies to over 50 destinations in 13 countries in the Asia Pacific region.

Destinations

References

Where we fly

See also
 Tigerair Singapore
 Tigerair Mandala
 Tigerair Australia 
 Tigerair Philippines
 Tigerair Taiwan

Lists of airline destinations